The Quaker Meeting House is a historic Quaker meeting house at the intersection of Quakertown Road and White Bridge Road in the Quakertown section of Franklin Township in Hunterdon County, New Jersey. In 1733, Quaker settlers acquired four acres of land here and built a log house for their first meeting house. A stone church was built here in 1754. The current building is a reconstruction built in 1862 using the original stones from that church. It is a key contributing property of the Quakertown Historic District, which was added to the National Register of Historic Places on August 23, 1990. The adjoining burial ground is also contributing to the district. The building is the only Quaker meeting house constructed in Hunterdon County.

Gallery

See also
 National Register of Historic Places listings in Hunterdon County, New Jersey
 List of Quaker meeting houses

References

External links 
 
 
 

Franklin Township, Hunterdon County, New Jersey
Quaker meeting houses in New Jersey
Churches on the National Register of Historic Places in New Jersey
Historic district contributing properties in Hunterdon County, New Jersey
Churches in Hunterdon County, New Jersey
Churches completed in 1862
Stone churches in New Jersey
Historic district contributing properties in New Jersey